Hoseynabad-e Korus (also Romanized as Hoseynābād-e Korūs; also known as Ḩoseynābād, Hoseynābād-e Korūs, Korūs-e Pā’īn, and Kūros) is a village in Eyvanki Rural District, Eyvanki District, Garmsar County, Semnan Province, Iran. At the 2006 census, its population was 107, in 27 families.

References 

Populated places in Garmsar County